Sigríður Ásthildur Andersen (born 21 November 1971) is an Icelandic politician and lawyer who served as the Minister of Justice of Iceland from 2017–2019. She resigned as minister of justice after the European Court of Human Rights found her appointments of judges to the Icelandic court of appeals to be illegal.

She has been a member of the Icelandic parliament (Althing) for the Independence Party since 2015.

Education and career 
Sigríður graduated from Reykjavik Junior College in 1991, studied law at the University of Iceland, and became an attorney in 2001. From 1999–2005 she worked as a lawyer at the Icelandic Chamber of Commerce, sat on the Council of District Courts from 2004–2009, and then worked at a private law firm from 2007–2015.

She was a deputy member of parliament for the Independence Party for a short while in 2008 and for a few months in 2012–2015. She then became an elected member of parliament in 2015.

Controversies
Sigríður has been a controversial figure during her tenure as the minister of justice. She played a pivotal role in the controversy surrounding the restored honour of a convicted child sex offender which led to the dissolution of the Cabinet of Iceland under prime minister Bjarni Benediktsson in 2017.

In 2017, she did not follow the recommendations of a special committee list of the most qualified judges for the newly formed Icelandic court of appeals and instead hand-picked 4 of them, including the wife of fellow Independence Party parliamentarian Brynjar Níelsson. On 12 March 2019 the European Court of Human Rights ruled that the appointments had been made illegally. On 13 March 2019, in the aftermath of the ruling, Sigríður announced that she would resign as minister of justice.

References

External links
 Biography of Sigríður Á. Andersen on the parliament website (Icelandic)
 Official website

1971 births
Living people
Sigrídur Á. Andersen
Sigrídur Á. Andersen
Sigrídur Á. Andersen
Sigrídur Á. Andersen
Sigrídur Á. Andersen
21st-century Icelandic politicians
Sigrídur Á. Andersen
Sigrídur Á. Andersen
Sigrídur Á. Andersen
Female justice ministers